Paul Nonga (born 18 June 1989) is a Tanzanian football striker who plays for Lipuli.

References

1989 births
Living people
Tanzanian footballers
Tanzania international footballers
Mbeya City F.C. players
Young Africans S.C. players
Mwadui United F.C. players
Lipuli F.C. players
Association football forwards
Tanzanian Premier League players